Chirsha-Tartysh (Şırşı-Tartış) is a rural locality (a selo) in Karacha-Yelginsky Selsoviet, Kushnarenkovsky District, Bashkortostan, Russia. The population was 366 as of 2010. There are 4 streets.

Geography 
Chirsha-Tartysh is located 18 km northwest of Kushnarenkovo (the district's administrative centre) by road. Karacha-Yelga is the nearest rural locality.

References 

Rural localities in Kushnarenkovsky District